The 2021 Southern Miss Golden Eagles baseball team represented the University of Southern Mississippi in the sport of baseball for the 2021 college baseball season. The Golden Eagles competed in Division I of the National Collegiate Athletic Association (NCAA) and in Conference USA West Division. They played their home games at Pete Taylor Park in Hattiesburg, Mississippi. The team was coached by Scott Berry, who was in his twelfth season with the Golden Eagles.

Preseason

Preseason All-American teams
2nd Team
Walker Powell – Right Hand Pitcher (Collegiate Baseball)

C-USA media poll
The Conference USA preseason poll was released on February 11, 2021 with the Golden Eagles predicted to finish first in the West Division.

Preseason CUSA Pitcher of the Year
Walker Powell – Senior, Right Hand Pitcher

Preseason All-CUSA team
Gabe Shepard – Starting Pitcher
Walker Powell  – Starting Pitcher
Hunter Stanley – Relief Pitcher
Gabe Montenegro – Outfielder

Schedule and results

Schedule Source:
*Rankings are based on the team's current ranking in the D1Baseball poll.

Rankings

References

External links
•	Southern Miss Baseball

Southern Miss
Southern Miss Golden Eagles baseball seasons
Southern Miss Golden Eagles
Southern Miss